Rachanaa Parulkkar is an Indian actress who works in Hindi television. She made her acting debut in 2009 with Saat Phere - Saloni Ka Safar portraying Savri Singh. Parulkar is best known for her portrayal of Kalpana Jadhav Singhania in Ek Mutthi Aasmaan and Maharani Ajabde Punwar in Bharat Ka Veer Putra – Maharana Pratap.

Personal life
Parulkar is a trained Kathak dancer and a student of Uma Dogra. She completed her training from Uma Dogra's School of Kathak.

Career 
Parulkar made her acting debut in 2009 with Saat Phere - Saloni Ka Safar portraying Savri Singh. She then appeared as Rano in Kis Desh Mein Hai Meraa Dil, the same year.

From 2010 to 2012, she portrayed Akruti in Sapnon Se Bhare Naina alongside Dishank Arora. In 2012, she appeared in an episode of Gumrah as Kanak Dagar.

Parulkar portrayal of Kalpana "Kalpi" Jadhav Singhania in Ek Mutthi Aasmaan opposite Ashish Chaudhary from 2013 to 2014, proved as a major turning point in her career.

Parulkar achieved further success with her portrayal of Maharani Ajabde Punwar opposite Sharad Malhotra in Bharat Ka Veer Putra – Maharana Pratap from 2014 to 2015.

In 2019, she portrayed Parvati in  Namah alongside Tarun Khanna. She also appeared in an uncredited role in Gunjan Saxena: The Kargil Girl.

Since 2022, Parulkar is seen portraying Shivani Pawar in Maddam Sir.

Media image 
In UK-based newspaper Eastern Eyes 50 Sexiest Asian Women List, Parulkar ranked 29th in 2014 and ranked 40th in 2015.

Filmography

Television

Films

Awards and nominations

References

External links 
 

Indian television actresses
Living people
1990 births